Big Flat is a town in Baxter and Searcy counties in the U.S. state of Arkansas. The population was 23 at the 2019 census.

Geography
Big Flat is located at  (36.002846, -92.409396).

According to the United States Census Bureau, the town has a total area of 2.8 km2 (1.1 mi2), of which 2.8 km2 (1.1 mi2) is land and 0.93% is water.

List of highways 

 Arkansas Highway 14
 Arkansas Highway 263

School district
The Baxter County portion of Big Flat is served by the Mountain View School District. The small section in Searcy County is in the Searcy County School District.

It was served by the Big Flat School District until July 1, 1985, when it merged with the Fifty Six School District into the Tri-County School District. On July 1, 1993, the Tri-County district was dissolved, with portions going to various districts, including the Mountain View district and the Marshall School District. Marshall consolidated into the Searcy County district on July 1, 2004.

Demographics

As of the census of 2000, there were 104 people, 49 households, and 24 families residing in the town. The population density was 37.2/km2 (96.6/mi2). There were 68 housing units at an average density of 24.3/km2 (63.1/mi2). The racial makeup of the town was 100.00% White.

There were 49 households, out of which 20.4% had children under the age of 18 living with them, 36.7% were married couples living together, 8.2% had a female householder with no husband present, and 49.0% were non-families. 44.9% of all households were made up of individuals, and 28.6% had someone living alone who was 65 years of age or older. The average household size was 2.12 and the average family size was 3.08.

In the town, the population was spread out, with 22.1% under the age of 18, 7.7% from 18 to 24, 23.1% from 25 to 44, 24.0% from 45 to 64, and 23.1% who were 65 years of age or older. The median age was 40 years. For every 100 females, there were 116.7 males. For every 100 females age 18 and over, there were 113.2 males.

The median income for a household in the town was $21,094, and the median income for a family was $24,375. Males had a median income of $18,750 versus $61,250 for females. The per capita income for the town was $11,294. There were no families and 11.3% of the population living below the poverty line, including no under eighteens and 34.8% of those over 64.

Notable people
 Robbie Branscum (1937–1997), author of children's books and young adult fiction
 Terry Wayne Wallis (1964-2022), car accident victim who awoke after 19-year coma

External links
 Encyclopedia of Arkansas History & Culture entry
 Map of Big Flat (US Census Bureau)
 Map of Baxter County (US Census Bureau)
 Map of Searcy County (US Census Bureau)
 Mountain View School District
 Baxter County Historical and Genealogical Society
 Searcy County Historical Society

References

Towns in Baxter County, Arkansas
Towns in Searcy County, Arkansas
Towns in Arkansas